1101 New York Avenue is a high-rise building located in Washington, D.C., United States. Designed by architect Kevin Roche, its construction was completed in 2007. The building was designed with notched corners to allow for more window offices. The building is tied for the 20th tallest building in Washington D.C.

The building houses Google's public policy offices., as well as the headquarters of the National Retail Federation (NRF).
The building also houses an Ernst & Young office.
The previous Global Chairman and CEO of Ernst & Young, Mark Weinberger was located at this office.

See also
List of tallest buildings in Washington, D.C.

References

Office buildings completed in 2007
Skyscraper office buildings in Washington, D.C.
2007 establishments in Washington, D.C.